Rao Raja Hanut Singh (20 March 1900 – 12 October 1982) was a British Indian Army soldier and polo player.

Biography
Hanut Singh was born at Jodhpur on 20 March 1900, the third son of Sir Pratap Singh of Idar. He was educated at Mayo College in Ajmer and at Eastbourne College in Sussex, as well as at L'Ecole de Cavalerie in France. He served as a Page of Honour to George V at the 1911 Delhi Durbar He was commissioned as a Second Lieutenant in the Jodhpur State Forces in 1914 and commissioned a temporary honorary Second Lieutenant in the British Army in July 1916.

During the First World War, Hanut Singh served with his father, who was one of the seven commanding officers of the 15th Imperial Service Cavalry Brigade that was formed from the Imperial Service Troops provided by various Indian Princely States to aid the British Empire during wartime. Hanut Singh served in France, Palestine and Syria and was a part of the Jodhpur Lancers. He was present at the taking of Haifa and at the fall of Aleppo in 1918. He served in the Egyptian Rebellion of 1919 and was appointed to an honorary Captaincy in the British Army in 1921.

Post-war
Until his father, Sir Pratap Singh's death in 1922, Hanut Singh served as his private secretary. From 1923 to 1925, he served as Comptroller of the Royal Household of Jodhpur, then as Officer of the Royal Stables until 1933, when he was promoted to Comptroller of the Royal Stables. In 1934, he was promoted to the rank of Major in the Jodhpur State Forces . He was awarded the title of Rao Bahadur in 1937. In 1941, he was promoted to the rank of Lieutenant-Colonel and became the Military Secretary for Jodhpur, serving until 1948. Hanut Singh was promoted to Colonel in 1946 and to Brigadier in 1947.

An outstanding polo player, he played and won many games for Jodhpur. Later he fielded his own team, Ratanada, with two of his sons, Rao Raja Bijai Singh and Rao Raja Hari Singh. Team Ratanada, won almost every tournament in India for many years.

Personal life
Rao Raja Hanut Singh married twice. His first wife, Rani Sirey Kanwar, was the daughter of HH Maharaja Sawai Madho Singh II of Jaipur. They had three children;

 Rajkumari Kalyan Kumari, who died young
 Rao Raja Bijai Singh who married Rao Rani Kamal Kumari (Baby) and have two children;
 Rao Raja Lakshman Singh (Bunny) (b. 1951) married Lata Kaicker and has two sons;
 Kunwar Arjun Singh (b.1981) who married Neha Mansukhani (b. 1983) and has two children;
 Kumari Nayantara Singh (b. 2016)
 Kumari Roohi Singh (b. 2019)
 Kunwar Ranjit Singh (b. 1985) who married Tripti Kankaria (b. 1983) and has one child;
 Kumari Indira Singh (b. 2019)
 Harsh Kumari (b.1953) married Raja Chandra Vijay Singh (b.1950) of Sahaspur  and has three children;
 Rani Uttara Singh Rathore (b.1976) who married Maharaj Suryaveer Singh Rathore of Jodhpur (b.1972). They have two sons;
 Kunwar Samarvir Singh Rathore (b.2001)
 Kunwar Hanut Singh Rathore (b.2007).
 Rajkumari Mallika Kumari Singh (b.1980) who married Kunwar Dhananjai Singh Jamwal (b.1979) They have one daughter, Anaheera Kumari.
 Rajkumar Surya Vijay Singh (b.1985)
 Rao Raja Hari Singh (Harry) married Rao Rani Nawal Kanwar (Jill) and a daughter
 Rajkumari Serena Kumari (b. 1972) 
 Rajita Singh Kumari (b.1997) who married Jaspal Singh (b.1990)

His second wife, Rani Priya Devi, was the daughter of HH Maharaja Amar Prakash Bahadur  of Sirmur. They had one son;

 Rao Raja Daljeet Singh (Tony), who married Rao Rani Shakti Kumari of Bundi. They have three children;
 Kunwar Dalpat Singh
 Kunwar Digvijay Singh married Kunwarani Mahima Rana of Sirmur. They have one son, Kunwar Jasmer Singh.
 Rajkumari Mamta Kumari married Kunwar Naveen Tomar of Dhoori son of Thakur Sahib Brigadier (Vir Chakra) JK Tomar( Meerut)

Later life
From 1949 to 1951, Hanut Singh served as the Minister for Health, Medical and Jails Departments for Rajasthan. In 1958, he was awarded the Padma Bhushan for his achievements and contributions to the game of polo, also receiving the Arjuna Award in 1964. He died at Jodhpur on 12 October 1982, aged 82. He left three sons.

Honours
Delhi Durbar silver medal – 1911
1914 Star
British War Medal – 1918
Victory Medal – 1918
India General Service Medal (1909) – 1919
Jodhpur Great War Service Medal – 1919
King George V Silver Jubilee Medal – 1935
Title of Rao Bahadur – 1937
King George VI Coronation Medal – 1937
Jodhpur Victory Medal – 1945
Indian Independence Medal – 1947
Padma Bhushan – 1958
Arjuna Award – 1964

References

External links

 

Indian polo players
British Indian Army officers
Rajasthani people
People educated at Eastbourne College
Pages of Honour
Recipients of the Arjuna Award
Recipients of the Padma Bhushan in public affairs
People from Jodhpur
Polo players from Rajasthan
Roehampton Trophy
1900 births
1982 deaths
Indian Army personnel of World War I